Selemani Yamin Ndikumana (born 18 March 1987) is a Burundian footballer who plays for KMC in Tanzania.

Career
The striker began his career with AS Inter Star and in 2006 joined Tanzanian Premier League club Simba SC. He moved in January 2008 to Norwegian side Molde FK. On 8 December 2008, he signed a one-and-a-half-year contract with Lierse S.K. in the Belgian Second Division. In the summer of 2010, he moved back to Burundi to play for Fantastique Bujumbura.

In January 2013, he joined Sudanese club Al-Merrikh SC.

On 31 January 2014, he joined Albanian club KF Tirana. He made his debut for Tirana on 7 February in a 1–0 win against rivals KF Partizani. Nine days later, he scored his first goal in Albania in another 1–0 win against Bylis Ballsh. On 2 March 2014, he scored his second goal for Tirana in a 1–1 against KF Flamurtari Vlora in Stadiumi Flamurtari.

In June 2015, he joined Angolan club C.D. Primeiro de Agosto. He was released, along with five other players, from the club at the end of the season.

On 29 January 2016, he, along with Fuadi Ndayisenga, signed for Burundian club Vital'O F.C.

On 27 July 2016, he joined Qatari club Al-Mesaimeer S.C.

International career
He is the captain of the Burundi national team.

International goals
Scores and results list Burundi's goal tally first.

Notes

References

External links

1987 births
Living people
Burundian footballers
Burundian expatriate footballers
Burundi international footballers
Association football forwards
Simba S.C. players
Molde FK players
Lierse S.K. players
Eliteserien players
Mesaimeer SC players
Vital'O F.C. players
Al-Merrikh SC players
Al-Adalah FC players
Azam F.C. players
Challenger Pro League players
Qatari Second Division players
Saudi First Division League players
Expatriate footballers in Albania
Expatriate footballers in Belgium
Expatriate footballers in China
Expatriate footballers in Norway
Expatriate footballers in Sudan
Expatriate footballers in Tanzania
Expatriate footballers in Qatar
Expatriate footballers in Saudi Arabia
Burundian expatriate sportspeople in Albania
Burundian expatriate sportspeople in Belgium
Burundian expatriate sportspeople in China
Burundian expatriate sportspeople in Norway
Burundian expatriate sportspeople in Sudan
Burundian expatriate sportspeople in Tanzania
Burundian expatriate sportspeople in Qatar
Burundian expatriate sportspeople in Saudi Arabia
2019 Africa Cup of Nations players
Tanzanian Premier League players
Burundi A' international footballers
2014 African Nations Championship players
Expatriate footballers in Rwanda